Noted Negro Women: Their Triumphs and Activities is an anthology of biographies of African-American women edited by Monroe Alpheus Majors published in 1893 in Chicago. Majors sketched the lives of nearly 300 women, including Edmonia Lewis, Amanda Smith, Ida B. Wells, and Sojourner Truth. Majors began to compile the book in Waco, Texas, in 1890. He hoped to show the worth of black women for themselves and as an expression of the value of all African Americans. A significant omission from the book was Harriet Tubman. The book sought to shape contemporary attitudes and historian Milton C. Sernett hypothesizes that including Tubman would invoke memories of the pain of slavery.

Majors' work was perhaps the first of its kind, although in the same year another anthology of biographies of African American Women was published, Women of Distinction. Women of Distinction was edited by Lawson A. Scruggs and included contributions by fifteen writers. These works coupled with the increased prominence of African American woman, and particularly the 1892 publication of Southern Horrors: Lynch Law in All Its Phases by Ida B. Wells led to 1893 being proclaimed "Year of the Black Women". Noted Negro Women and Women of Distinction were volumes about notable African American women which were a part of a group of biographical anthologies about African Americans published in the late 1800s and early 1900s. Majors' work was meant to inspire women and serve as a manual of feminine behavior. Majors' and Scruggs' books reflected fresh optimism about the future of African Americans. Frederick Douglass was skeptical of the project, stating in regards to an inquiry by Majors for his book that he did not know of any women who could be called famous.

List of individuals with biographies in anthology

Octavia V. Rogers Albert
Caroline Still Anderson
Naomi Anderson
Flora Batson
Rosa Dixon Bowser
Mary E. Britton
Hallie Quinn Brown
Pauline Powell Burns
Lulu Vere Childers
Lucretia Newman Coleman
Anna J. Cooper
Fanny Jackson Coppin
Julia Ringwood Coston
Olivia A. Davidson
Henrietta Vinton Davis
Georgia Mabel DeBaptiste
Louise De Mortie
Dr. H. T. Dillon
Sarah Jane Woodson Early
Ida Gibbs
Ida Gray
Elizabeth Greenfield
Charlotte Forten Grimké
Frances Harper
Myrtle Hart
Josephine D. Heard
Joan Imogen Howard
Hyers Sisters
Amelia E. Johnson
Matilda Sissieretta Joyner Jones
Sophia B. Jones
Elizabeth Keckley
Lucy Craft Laney
Nellie A. Ramsey Leslie
Edmonia Lewis
Lillian A. Lewis
Harriet Gibbs Marshall
Louise De Mortie
Gertrude Bustill Mossell
Lucy Ella Moten
Ednorah Nahar
Effie Lee Newsome
Nzinga of Ndongo and Matamba
Zelia Ball Page
Mary Virginia Cook Parrish
Georgia E. L. Patton Washington
Mary S. Peake
Ida Platt
Frances E. L. Preston
Ranavalona III
Charlotte E. Ray
Emma Ann Reynolds
Martha Ann Erskine Ricks
Celia Dial Saxon
Mary Ann Shadd
Susie Lankford Shorter
Amanda Smith
Christine Shoecraft Smith
Lucy Wilmot Smith
Susan McKinney Steward
Elizabeth Stumm
Mary Church Terrell
Clarissa M. Thompson
Amelia Tilghman
Katherine D. Chapman Tillman
Sojourner Truth
Olivia A. Davidson
Josephine Turpin Washington
Ida B. Wells
Julia Williams (abolitionist)
Marie Selika Williams
Phillis Wheatley

References

External links
 Majors, Monroe Alphus. Noted Negro women: Their triumphs and activities. Donohue & Henneberry, 1893.

1893 non-fiction books
Books about African-American history
Lists of African-American people
United States biographical dictionaries